The House of Assembly was the legislature of British Guiana in the 1950s and 1960s.

History
The House of Assembly was established as a result of the Waddington Commission, which led to the enactment of constitutional reforms in 1952; universal suffrage was introduced and the Legislative Council was to be replaced by the House of Assembly. The new House had 28 members; 24 members elected in single member constituencies, a speaker appointed by the Governor and three ex officio members (the Chief Secretary, the Attorney General and the Financial Secretary). The term of the final Legislative Council was extended in order to allow preparations for elections under the new system on 27 April 1953.

The elections were won by the People's Progressive Party (PPP) led by Cheddi Jagan, who became Prime Minister, whilst Eustace Gordon Woolford was appointed Speaker of the new House. Its first meeting was held on 18 May. After assuming power Jagan embarked on implementing a series of policies that involved radical social reform, mainly directed at the colonial oligarchy. The British colonial authorities sent in troops in response to the alleged threat of a Marxist revolution. Governor Alfred Savage suspended the constitution on 9 October (only 133 days after it had come into force); the House of Assembly was prorogued, before being dissolved on 21 December. A wholly appointed Interim Legislative Council was established in place of the Assembly.

Constitutional reforms in 1964 led to the re-establishment of the House of Assembly as a replacement for the bicameral Legislature, which had been created in 1961. The new House was a 54-seat body, consisting of 53 elected members and the Speaker. The elections were held  on 7 December 1964 using proportional representation to allocate the seats, and although  the PPP won the most seats, the People's National Congress (PNC) and United Force were able to form a coalition government with a working majority. Despite losing the elections, Jagan refused to resign as Prime Minister, and had to be removed by Governor Richard Luyt, with Forbes Burnham replacing him. The new House met for the first time on 31 December, although the meeting was boycotted by the PPP. Aubrey Percival Alleyne of the PNC was elected Speaker, and subsequently vacated his seat, allowing Philip Duncan of the PNC to take his place.

On 26 May 1966 the country became independent under the name of Guyana. A new constitution came into force, replacing the House of Assembly with the National Assembly.

List of members

1953

1964–1966

References

Political history of Guyana
1953 establishments in British Guiana
1953 disestablishments in British Guiana
1964 establishments in British Guiana
1966 disestablishments in Guyana
Historical legislatures
Defunct unicameral legislatures
British Guiana